King of tha Ghetto: Power is the eleventh solo studio album by American rapper Z-Ro. It was released on May 8, 2007 through Rap-A-Lot Records, Asylum Records and Atlantic Records. It features guest appearances from Point Blank, Spice 1, B.G. Duke, Big Boss, Big Shasta, D-Bo, Dougie D, Lil' Flip, Mike D, Pimp C and Vicious. The album peaked at number 197 on the Billboard 200 in the United States.

Track listing

Charts

References

External links

2007 albums
Z-Ro albums
Albums produced by Z-Ro
Rap-A-Lot Records albums